George Clark Fairfield (24 June 1912 – 9 November 1978) was a Progressive Conservative member of the House of Commons of Canada. He was a physician and surgeon by career, after graduating from the University of Manitoba.

He was first elected at the Portage—Neepawa riding in the 1957 general election and re-elected for a second term in the 1958 election, serving in the 23rd and 24th Parliaments. He served as a backbench supporter of Prime Minister John Diefenbaker's government. After finishing his second term, Fairfield did not campaign for further terms in federal office.

References

External links
 

1912 births
1978 deaths
Canadian surgeons
Members of the House of Commons of Canada from Manitoba
Progressive Conservative Party of Canada MPs
University of Manitoba alumni
20th-century Canadian physicians
20th-century surgeons